The Municipality of Zreče is a municipality below the slopes of Pohorje in northeastern Slovenia. Its seat is the town of Zreče. The area is part of the traditional region of Styria. The municipality is now included in the Savinja Statistical Region.

Geography

Settlements
In addition to the municipal seat of Zreče, the municipality also includes the following settlements:

 Bezovje nad Zrečami
 Boharina
 Bukovlje
 Čretvež
 Črešnova
 Dobrovlje
 Gorenje pri Zrečah
 Gornja Vas
 Gračič
 Koroška Vas na Pohorju
 Križevec
 Lipa
 Loška Gora pri Zrečah
 Mala Gora
 Osredek pri Zrečah
 Padeški Vrh
 Planina na Pohorju
 Polajna
 Radana Vas
 Resnik
 Rogla
 Skomarje
 Spodnje Stranice
 Stranice
 Zabork
 Zlakova

Administration
The current mayor is Boris Podvršnik. The mayor leads the municipal council and oversees the implementation of its decision. He is responsible for implementing the county policy and supervises the work of the municipal administration, public services, institutions and funds. The distinctive yellow and green coat of arms and flag of Zreče were adopted in September 1995. It is yellow, vertically divided with a green heart with two wavy lines at the bottom of it.

References

External links
 
 Zreče municipal site
 Municipality of Zreče at Geopedia

Zreče
1994 establishments in Slovenia